Sharh Sahih Muslim (Commentary of Sahih Muslim) may refer to:

Fath al-Mulhim
Takmilat Fath al-Mulhim
Al Minhaj bi Sharh Sahih Muslim